The men's football tournament at the 2019 Pan American Games will be held in Lima from 29 July to 10 August 2019. The eight teams involved in the tournament were required to register a squad of 18 players, including two goalkeepers.

Teams participating in the men's competition were restricted to under-22 players (born on or after 1 January 1997) with a maximum of three overage players allowed.

Overage players indicated in bold. Caps and goals as of the start of the tournament (29 July 2019) and includes only senior team statistics

Group A

Panama
Head coach: Julio Dely Valdés

Three overage players were named on 11 July 2019. The 18-man squad was announced on 13 July 2019. Midfielder Justin Simons was replaced by Maikell Díaz.

Mexico
Head coach: Jaime Lozano

The 18-man squad was announced on 29 June 2019. Vladimir Loroña, Héctor Mascorro and Martín Rodríguez were replaced by Kevin Álvarez, Pablo César López and Oscar Macías due to individual injuries. On 28 July 2019 forward Eduardo Aguirre was replaced by Diego Abella due to an injury.

Ecuador
Head coach: Jorge Célico

The 18-man squad was announced on 18 July 2019. On 30 July, defender Bryan Carabalí was replaced by Jackson Porozo because Emelec denied the call of his new player Carabalí.

Argentina
Head coach: Fernando Batista

The 18-man squad was announced on 17 July 2019.

Group B

Jamaica
Head coach: Donovan Duckie

The 18-man squad was announced on 21 July 2019. On 23 July defender Alwayne Harvey was replaced by Andre Leslie. Later, forward Alex Marshall was replaced by Sheldon McKoy.

Honduras
Head coach:  Fabián Coito.

The 18-man squad was announced on 22 July 2019.

Uruguay
Head coach: Gustavo Ferreyra

The 18-man squad was announced on 28 June 2019.

Peru
Head coach: Nolberto Solano

The 18-man squad was announced on 27 June 2019.

References

Men's team aquads
Pan American Games football squads